Bogolo Joy Kenewendo (born c. 1987) is a  Botswana global economist and politician with deep expertise in international trade and development. She has a particular focus on Pan-African development and a passion for accelerating digitization and innovation across the continent. She is the former Cabinet Minister of Investment, Trade and Industry of Botswana. Kenewendo was dropped from cabinet in March 2020. Since then, she serves as the Managing Director of Kenewendo Advisory, based in Gaborone, Botswana. She leads Molaya Kgosi Women Leadership and Mentorship Program and the Board Chair of Molaya Kgosi Trust.

Background and education
Kenewendo was born in Motopi Village in the Boteti Area, in Botswana circa 1987. After attending primary school, she enrolled in Pitzer College. She was then admitted to the University of Botswana, graduating with a Bachelor of Arts in Economics. Later, she obtained a Master of Science in International Economics from the University of Sussex in the United Kingdom. She is also a Certified Project Manager. She received training in Economic Freedom Philosophy from the Foundation for Economic Education.

Career before politics
For a period of time after her postgraduate studies at the University of Sussex in the United Kingdom as Chevening Scholar earning an Msc International Economics, Kenewendo worked as a trade economist ODI Fellow in the Ghanaian Ministry of Trade and Industry. She also served as an economic consultant at Econsult Botswana, a Gaborone-based think tank.

Political career
In 2016, the then president of Botswana, Ian Khama, nominated Kenewendo to the Parliament of Botswana, where she was elected as a presidential nominee to parliament. On 4 April 2018, the new incoming president, Mokgweetsi Masisi, appointed Kenewendo as the new Minister of Investment, Trade and Industry. She was sworn-in the same day.

In her capacity as minister, Kenewendo was appointed by United Nations Secretary General António Guterres in 2018 to the High-level Panel on Digital Cooperation, co-chaired by Melinda Gates and Jack Ma. As the Minister of Investment, Trade and Industry in Botswana, she implemented reforms to significantly improve the ease of doing business, open up both domestic and international markets, and position the country to succeed in the global value chains as well as the digital economy. During her tenure, she was the youngest Cabinet Minister in Africa and in Botswana’s history.

Kenewendo was cited as one of the Top 100 most influential Africans by New African magazine in 2018.

When the United Kingdom assumed the presidency of the G7 in 2021, Kenewendo was appointed by the country's Minister for Women and Equalities, Liz Truss, to a newly formed Gender Equality Advisory Council (GEAC) chaired by Sarah Sands. 

In June 2022, Kenewendo was appointed as the UN Climate Change High-Level Champions’ Special Advisor, Africa Director.

Personal life
In her spare time, Kenewendo meditates, travels and reads.

See also
 Cabinet of Botswana
 Parliament of Botswana

References

External links
 Personal Webpage
 Bogolo Kenewendo, Botswana Young Female Minister Rocks Social Media As of 5 April 2018.

1987 births
Living people
Botswana economists
Members of the National Assembly (Botswana)
Government ministers of Botswana
University of Botswana alumni
Alumni of the University of Sussex
21st-century Botswana women politicians
21st-century Botswana politicians
Women government ministers of Botswana
Women members of the Parliament of Botswana
Botswana women economists
Botswana women in business
Chevening Scholars